Tahu may refer to:


Geography
 Tahu, Palpa, a village development committee in Nepal
 Tahu, Estonia, village in Lääne-Nigula Parish, Lääne County, Estonia; Swedish name: Skåtanäs
 Tahu Culture in southern Taiwan

People
First name
 Tahu Hole (1906–1985), New Zealand-born BBC journalist
 Tahu Matheson (born 1977), New Zealand pianist and conductor
 Teddy Tahu Rhodes (born 1966), New Zealand operatic baritone

Last name
 Matiu Parakatone Tahu (?–1863), New Zealand tribal tohunga (expert) and mission teacher
 Timana Tahu (born 1980), Australian rugby league and rugby union player

Other
 Tahu, the Toa Nuva of Fire (formerly Toa Mata) in the Lego Bionicle line
 Indonesian and Tamil name for tofu

See also